TJ Richards & Sons was a coachbuilding company which operated in Australia under various names from 1885 through to 1951.

TJ Richards, Wheel Wright and Coach Builder
The history of TJ Richards and Sons began in 1885 when Adelaide-born blacksmith Tobias John Martin Richards opened a business named "TJ Richards, Wheel Wright and Coach Builder" in the Adelaide suburb of Mitcham. Richards developed the "King of the Road" two wheeled sulky and also adopted this name as his trade slogan. In 1900 the company moved to new larger premises in Hindmarsh Square in the city of Adelaide. Agencies were established in other Australian locations and exports to overseas countries including England, South Africa and India were undertaken. Richards coachwork won over 500 awards in various exhibitions.

By 1903 Richards had been joined in the business by his three sons Henry Ernest, Claude Alfred Victor and William Egbert. The company produced its first automobile body in 1905 and a dedicated department for this activity was formed in 1912.

TJ Richards & Sons

In 1913 the company name was changed to "TJ Richards & Sons", Richards having recently handed over the operation of the company to his sons. In 1920 the company moved again, this time to a -acre site on the corner of Anzac Highway and Leader Street in the Adelaide suburb of Keswick. The first mechanical body press was installed in 1924 and an assembly line was established shortly after this. Bodies were produced for various makes including Bianchi, Citroën, Fiat, Maxwell, Hudson, Oakland, Overland, Armstrong Siddeley, Austin, Hupmobile, Berliet, Durant, Amilcar, Rover and Rolls-Royce.

In 1928 an additional factory was established in the Adelaide suburb of Mile End. In the same year Richards and Sons forged a relationship with the Chrysler Corporation and subsequently the production of bodies for Chrysler, Dodge, DeSoto and Plymouth automobiles became the company's main activity. In 1936 the recently formed Australian company Chrysler Dodge Distributors Limited purchased part of TJ Richards & Sons, taking a controlling interest the following year.

Richards Industries

In 1941 TJ Richards & Sons was renamed to Richards Industries Limited. During World War 2 production changed to munitions and aircraft components, with wing panels for the Bristol Beaufort and the CAC Wirraway being the major focus.

Chrysler Dodge DeSoto Distributors Limited
The Richards family sold their remaining stake in the company to Chrysler Dodge Distributors Limited in 1946. The name was changed to Chrysler Dodge DeSoto Distributors Limited  and the parent company also changed its name, to Chrysler Dodge Distributors (Holdings) Pty Ltd.

In 1951 the American Chrysler Corporation bought 85% of Chrysler Dodge Distributors (Holdings) Pty Ltd and renamed it Chrysler Australia.

References

Chrysler
Coachbuilders of Australia
Economic history of South Australia
Vehicle manufacturing companies established in 1885
Vehicle manufacturing companies disestablished in 1951
Australian companies established in 1885
1951 disestablishments in Australia